Akshaya Tritiya, also known as Akti or Akha Teej, is an annual Hindu and Jain spring festival. It falls on the third tithi (lunar day) of the bright half (Shukla Paksha) of the month of Vaisakha. It is regionally observed as an auspicious day by Hindus and Jains in India, it signifies the "third day of unending prosperity".

Meaning 
In Sanskrit, the word akshaya (अक्षय) means "never decreasing" in the sense of "prosperity, hope, joy, success", while tritiya means "third phase of the moon". It is named after the third lunar day of the spring month of Vaisakha in the Hindu calendar, when it is observed.

Hindu tradition

Akshaya Tritiya is considered auspicious by Hindus and Jains in many regions of India for new ventures, marriages, expensive investments such as gold or other property, and any new beginnings. It is also a day of remembrance for the loved ones who have died. The day is regionally significant for women, married or unmarried, who pray for the well being of the men in their lives or the one they may in future get engaged to. After prayers, they distribute germinating gram (sprouts), fresh fruits and Indian sweets. If Akshaya Tritiya falls on a Monday (Rohini), the festival is believed to be even more auspicious. Fasting, charity and helping others on this day is another festive practice. In Shlok 23-24 of Shrimad Bhagwat Geeta Adhyay 16, the knowledge-giver of Gita, while giving directions clearly says that the seekers who do any spiritual practice other than the activities of worship described in the scriptures, they neither get happiness, nor do they get siddhi, and neither do they attain salvation, that is, it is a vain worship. Seeker should give up all those activities which are not mentioned in Gita and Vedas i.e. God-given scriptures.

The festival is related the presentation of the Akshaya Patra to Draupadi by the god Krishna during the visit of numerous sages, including the sage Durvasa. During their exile in the forest, the Pandava princes were famished due to the lack of food, and their wife Draupadi was pained by this because she could not extend the customary hospitality to their guests. Yudhishthira, the eldest Pandava, prayed to the god Surya, who gave him this bowl, which would remain full till Draupadi served all of their guests. During Durvasa's visit, Krishna made this bowl invincible for Draupadi so that the magical bowl called Akshaya Patra would always remain full with food of their choice, even as to satiate the whole universe if required.

Akshaya Tritiya is believed by Hindus to be the birthday of Parasurama, the sixth avatar of the god Vishnu. He is revered in Vaishnava temples. Those who observe it in honor of Parasurama sometimes refer to the festival as Parasurama Jayanti. Alternatively, some focus their reverence on Krishna, the eighth avatar of Vishnu.

According to one legend, the sage Vyasa began reciting the Hindu epic Mahabharata to the god Ganesha on Akshaya Tritiya. Another legend states that the river Ganges descended to earth on this day. The Yamunotri Temple and Gangotri Temple are opened on the auspicious occasion of Akshaya Tritiya during the Chota Char Dham pilgrimage, after closing down during the heavy snowfall-laden winters of the Himalayan regions. The temples are opened on Abhijit Muhurat of Akshaya Tritya.

Another event linked to the day is Sudama's visit to his childhood friend, Krishna in Dwarka, when he received unlimited wealth as a boon. Kubera is believed to have appointed the god of wealth on this auspicious day.

In Odisha, Akshaya Tritiya is celebrated during the commencement of the sowing of rice paddy for the ensuing Kharif season. The day starts with ritual worship of mother Earth, the bullocks, other traditional farm equipment and seeds by the farmers for the blessings of a good harvest. After ploughing the fields, the farmers sow paddy seeds as the symbolic start for the most important Kharif crop of the state. This ritual is called Akhi Muthi Anukula (Akhi- Akshaya Tritiya; Muthi- fistful of paddy; Anukula- commencement or inauguration) and is celebrated with much fanfare throughout the state. In recent years, the event has received much publicity due to ceremonial Akhi Muthi Anukula programs organized by farmers' organizations and political parties. The construction of chariots for the Ratha Yatra festivities of Jagannath Temple also commences on this day at Puri.

In the Telugu-speaking states of Telangana and Andhra Pradesh, the festival is associated with prosperity, and women purchase gold and jewellery. Simhachalam temple observes special festive rituals on this day. The main deity of the temple is covered in sandalwood paste for the rest of the year, and only on this day are the layers of sandalwood applied to the deity removed to show the underlying statue. Display of the actual form or Nija Roopa Darsanam happens on this day.

This day is highly auspicious for those who buy gold and silver. buy rice, deposit money in a bank account, buy any kind of new things or vessels visiting famous temples, donating foods or special offer for poor peoples, or helping poor children for there education fees, all are good signs for akshaya tritya.

Jain tradition

In Jainism, Akshaya Tritiya commemorates the first Tirthankara, (Rishabhanatha), ending his one-year asceticism by consuming sugarcane juice poured into his cupped hands. Some Jains refer to the festival as Varshi Tapa. Fasting and ascetic austerities are marked by Jains, particularly at pilgrimage sites such as Palitana (Gujarat). On this day, people who observe the year-long alternative day fasting known as varshi-tap finish their tapasya by doing parana (drinking sugarcane juice).

See also 
 Panchangam
 Panjikad
 Visakha Puja, in Buddhism

References

Citations

Sources
  (AES reprint).

Hindu holy days
Jain festivals
April observances
May observances
Hindu festivals in India
Hindu festivals
Religious festivals in India